This is a list of notable individuals of Iranian ancestry who grew up and/or live in Germany.

Sports
 Patrik Baboumian
 Daniel Davari
 Ashkan Dejagah
 Sara Doorsoun
 Benjamin Ebrahimzadeh
 Alireza Marzban
 Alexander Nouri
 Reza Parkas
 Shervin Radjabali-Fardi
 Babak Rafati
 Amir Shapourzadeh
 Fereydoun Zandi

Music
Rapper
 Nimo
  
 
 
 
 
 
 
 
 
 

Rapper & Singer
 Shirin David

Rap-Journalists
 

Singer
 Mehrzad Marashi - DSDS Winner 2010
 
 Shahin Najafi
 Navid Akhavan
 Maryam Akhondy 
 Ateed
 Sima Bina

Composer
 Ramin Djawadi
 Sima Bina, notable Persian classical musician (singer), composer, researcher, painter
 Amir Abbas Zare, musician and composer

Academia/science
 Katajun Amirpur, scholar 
 Nossrat Peseschkian
 Majid Samii
 Rahim Rahmanzadeh, orthopedist

Arts/entertainment
Comedians
 Enissa Amani
 
 

TV presenter
 Melissa Khalaj
 Enissa Amani

Actors
 Enissa Amani
 
 Navid Akhavan
 Shaghayegh Dehghan
 Narges Rashidi
 Melika Foroutan
 Mohammad Khalkhalian
 Shermine Shahrivar
 Taies Farzan
 Fereydoun Farrokhzad, actor, entertainer

Film directors
 Mohammad Farokhmanesh
 Daryush Shokof, artist, film producer and director

Rest
 Akbar Behkalam, Painter
 Niloofar Beyzaie, Playwright, Theatre director
 Yasmine Mahmoudieh, architect, interior designer, and CEO
 Naveed Nour, photographer
 Benny Rebel, photographer
 Hadi Teherani, architect and designer

Politics
 Sahra Wagenknecht, parliamentary chairperson of the German Left Party since 2010, Leader of the Opposition in Germany 2015-2017, chancellor candidate in 2017 German federal election
 Yasmin Fahimi, politician and since January 2014 the general secretary of the Social Democratic Party (SPD).
 Omid Nouripour, Alliance 90/The Greens
 Bahman Nirumand
 Mina Ahadi
 Mitra Razavi

Media/journalism
 Abbas Maroufi, publisher
 Navid Kermani, writer and scholar
  - TV
  - TV
  - TV

Alternative journalism
 Ken Jebsen

Business/technology
 Hossein Sabet, entrepreneur, hotel owner worldwide.
 Sandra Navidi, strategic and macroeconomics advisor

Literature
 Abbas Maroufi, novelist
 Sudabeh Mohafez, writer
 Alexios Schandermani, writer

Personalities
 Soraya Esfandiary,  ex-wife of Shah Mohammad Reza Pahlavi and Queen Consort of Iran
 Abdoldjavad Falaturi

See also
Iranians in Germany
List of Iranians
Iranian diaspora

References

Germany
Iranians